Alaşehir, in Antiquity and the Middle Ages known as Philadelphia (i.e., "the city of him who loves his brother"), is a town and district of Manisa Province in the Aegean region of Turkey. It is situated in the valley of the Kuzuçay (Cogamus in antiquity), at the foot of the Bozdağ Mountain (Mount Tmolus in antiquity). The town is connected to İzmir by a  railway.

It stands on elevated ground commanding the extensive and fertile plain of the Gediz River (Hermus in antiquity), presenting an imposing appearance when seen from a distance. It has about 45 mosques. There are small industries and a fair trade. From one of the mineral springs comes a heavily charged water popular around Turkey.

Within Turkey, the city's name is synonymous with the dried Sultana raisins, although cultivation for the fresh fruit market, less labour-intensive than the dried fruit, has gained prominence in recent decades. As Philadelphia, Alaşehir was a highly important center in the Early Christian and Byzantine periods. It remained a strong center of Orthodox Christianity until the early 20th century, and remains a titular see of the Roman Catholic Church.

History
Ancient episcopal sees of the late Roman province of Lydia are listed in the Annuario Pontificio as titular sees:

Ancient Philadelphia
Alaşehir began as perhaps one of the first ancient cities with the name Philadelphia. It was established in 189 BC by King Eumenes II of Pergamon (197–160 BC). Eumenes II named the city for the love of his brother, who would be his successor, Attalus II (159–138 BC), whose loyalty earned him the nickname, "Philadelphos", literally meaning "one who loves his brother". The city is perhaps best known as the site of one of the seven churches of Asia in the Book of Revelation.

Lacking an heir, Attalus III Philometer, the last of the Attalid kings of Pergamum, bequeathed his kingdom, including Philadelphia, to his Roman allies when he died in 133 BC. Rome established the province of Asia in 129 BC by combining Ionia and the former Kingdom of Pergamum.

Roman Philadelphia
Philadelphia was in the administrative district of Sardis (Pliny NH 5.111). In AD 17, the city suffered badly in an earthquake, and Roman Emperor Tiberius relieved it of having to pay taxes (Tacitus Annales 2.47, cf. Strabo 12.8.18, 13.4.10, John Lydus de mensibus 4.115). In response, the city granted honors to Tiberius. Evidence from coinage reveals that Caligula helped the city; under Vespasian, Philadelphia received his cognomen, Flavia. Under Caracalla, Philadelphia housed an imperial cult. Its coins bore the word Neokoron (literally, "temple-sweeper", caretaker of the temple). A small theatre, located at the northern edge of Toptepe Hill, is all that remains of Roman Philadelphia.

Philadelphia in the Book of Revelation
Although several ancient cities bore the name of Philadelphia, it is generally agreed to be the one listed among the seven churches written to by John in the Book of Revelation. Philadelphia is listed as the sixth church of the seven. A letter specifically addressed to the Philadelphian church is recorded in 
(). The city's history of earthquakes may lie behind the reference to making her church "a pillar in the temple".

Aside from the fact that Smyrna was warned of temptation lasting "ten days", and Philadelphia was promised a total exemption, or preservation, from temptation, Philadelphia shares with Smyrna the distinction of receiving nothing but praise from Christ. That explains why modern Protestant churches sometimes use "Philadelphia" as a component in the local church's name as a way of emphasizing its faithfulness.

Byzantine Philadelphia
Philadelphia was a prosperous Byzantine city that was called the "little Athens" in the 6th century AD because of its festivals and temples. Presumably, that indicates that the city was not entirely converted to Christianity. Ammia, the Christian prophetess, was from Philadelphia, however.  In about 600, the domed Basilica of St. John was built, remains of which are the main archaeological attraction in the modern city. The Byzantine walls that once surrounded the city have all but crumbled away. A few remnants are still visible at the northeast edge of town, near the bus stand. The city was taken by the Seljuk Turks in 1074 and 1093–1094. In 1098, during the First Crusade, it was recovered by Byzantine Emperor Alexios I. In the 11th to the 15th centuries AD, it was the seat of the doux (governor) and stratopedarches (military commander) of the Thrakesion theme.

It was the centre of several revolts against ruling Byzantine emperors: in 1182, led by John Komnenos Vatatzes, and 1188–1205 or 1206, led by Theodore Mangaphas, a local Philadelphian, against Isaac II Angelos. At that time, the bishopric of Philadelphia was promoted to metropolis. In the 14th century, Philadelphia was made the metropolis of Lydia by the Greek Orthodox patriarch of Constantinople, a status that it still holds. It was granted this honour because the city did not capitulate to the Ottomans. The city was prosperous especially in the 13th and 14th centuries: there was a Genoese trading colony, and the city was an important producer of leather goods and red-dyed silk (whence, perhaps, its Turkish name, which probably means "red city").  By the 14th century, the city was surrounded by Ottoman emirates but maintained nominal allegiance to the Byzantine emperor. The city remained prosperous through trade and its strategic location.

Philadelphia was an independent neutral city under the influence of the Latin Knights of Rhodes, when it was taken in 1390 by Bayezid I and an auxiliary Christian force under Byzantine emperor Manuel II after prolonged resistance by when all of the other cities of Asia Minor had surrendered to the Ottomans. Manuel had been forced by Bayezid to participate in subjugating Philadelphia to Ottoman rule, a bitter irony given its long resistance. Twelve years later, it was captured by Timur, who built a wall with the corpses of his prisoners. Later, it passed into the rule of Junayd until it was ultimately captured by Murad II.

Modern period
From 1867 until 1922, Alaşehir was part of the Aidin Vilayet of the Ottoman Empire.  The Greek Army occupied the city during the Greco-Turkish War (1919–1922). There is dissent about who burned Philadelphia in 1922. American Consul George Horton wrote in his memoirs  about the Turkish army tactics of burning every Greek city that they entered, which culminated with the Great Fire of Smyrna. Other accounts put the blame on the other side in which retreating Greek Army carried out a scorched-earth policy while it was retreating from Anatolia during the final phase of the war, which included the Fire of Alaşehir. According to Park, 70% of the buildings of Alaşehir were destroyed by fire, and Kinross wrote, "Alaşehir was no more than a dark scorched cavity, defacing the hillside. Village after village had been reduced to an ash-heap". It is estimated that some 3,000 lives were lost in the burning of Alaşehir.

A suburb of Athens, Nea Filadelfia ("New Philadelphia"), is named from the Greek refugees from Alaşehir (in Greek known as "Philadelphia") who settled there following the war and the population exchange between Greece and Turkey of 1923.

The city was the site of the Alaşehir Congress in 1919.

In 1969, a magnitude 6.7 earthquake struck the city and killed 53 people.

Archaeological Remains
For survey of remains see Erdoğan (2015).
 Ancient Theater
 Ancient Stadium
 Ancient Temple
 Necropolis and hypogea
 Byzantine city walls
 Basilica of St John

Demographics
The population of Alaşehir in 1990 was 36,649.

Notable people from Alaşehir
 Joannes Laurentius Lydus (b. 490) ancient Greek administrator and writer
 Theodore Mangaphas known also as Morotheodoros (born in 12th century), Byzantine Greek military officer and usurper
 Kenan Evren, Turkish president and general

Notable bishops

 Cyriacus (at the Council of Philippopolis, 344)
 Theodosius (deposed at the Council of Seleucia, 359)
 Theophanes (at the First Council of Ephesus, 431)
 John (at the Third Council of Constantinople, 680)
 Theoleptus of Philadelphia (1283–1322): led defense of the city against Turkish attack in 1310; writings include religious poetry, monastic treatises, anti-Arsenite writings, letters
Macarius Chrysocephalas (1336–1382): candidate for patriarchate in 1353, wrote Rhodonia (anthology of proverbs and gnomai), catenae ("chains", quotations from theologians attached to Bible verses) on Matthew and Luke, homilies, and a vita of St. Meletios of Galesios

 Gabrius Severus (1577) wrote works against the Latins
 Gerasimus Blachus (1679), author of numerous works
 Meletius Typaldus (1685), deposed for becoming a Catholic

Philadelphia remains the seat of the Metropolis of Philadelphia, which has been a titular see since the Greco-Turkish population exchange.

Although the Philadelphia area was an Orthodox area, the Roman Catholic Church have maintained a rival titular bishop of Philadelphia since the 1500s. Catholic bishops have included:

Bernardo Jordán, (14 Apr 1535 Appointed1539) 
Philippe Musnier (15 Jun 1545 –) 
Marcus Lyresius (8 Jan 1603 Appointed28 Jun 1611) 
Georg Christoph Rösch (16 Jul 1612 Appointed30 Nov 1634) 
Michael Dalmeras (23 Oct 1623 Appointed13 Dec 1629) 
William Giles (9 Sep 1904 Appointed28 Jul 1913) 
Domenico Pasi (9 Sep 1913 Appointed15 Dec 1919) 
Francis Vazhapilly (7 Apr 1921 Appointed21 Dec 1923) 
 Agnello Renzullo (11 Apr 1924 Appointed20 Oct 1925 ) 
Luigi Mazzini (24 Jun 1926 Appointed13 Dec 1950 Died) 
 Pietro Zuccarino (5 Jan 1951 Appointed29 Nov 1953) 
 João de Deus Ramalho, (9 Dec 1953 Appointed25 Feb 1958 ) 
Augustin Arce Mostajo (22 May 1958 Appointed26 Nov 1970)

See also

 Christianity in the 1st century
 Christianity in the 2nd century
 Early centers of Christianity
 Early Christian art and architecture
 Early Christianity
 List of earthquakes in Turkey

Notes

References 

The Letters to the Seven Churches of Asia And their place in the plan of the Apocalypse, W. M. Ramsay, D.C.L, Litt.D., LL.D., Professor of Humanity in the University of Aberdeen, 1904

External links

 
189 BC
180s BC establishments
Populated places established in the 2nd century BC
Attalid colonies
Roman towns and cities in Turkey
Philadelphia in Lydia
Populated places in Manisa Province
Ancient Greek archaeological sites in Turkey